According to the dubious Chronicle of the Priest of Duklja, a Magyar leader named Kisa led an invasion into Bosnia, where he was decisively defeated by Časlav, the Prince of Serbia (r. 927–960), somewhere on the Drina. Kisa's widow requested from the Magyar chief to give her another army to avenge his death. With an "unknown number" of troops, the widow went for Časlav, encountering him somewhere in Syrmia. In the night, the Magyars attacked the Serbs, captured Časlav and all of his male relatives. On the command of the widow, all of them were bound by their hands and feet and thrown into the Sava river. Vladimir Ćorović dates this event to  960.

References

Sources
 
 
 
 

Battles involving Serbia in the Middle Ages
Battles involving Hungary
Hungarian invasions of Europe
10th century in Serbia
10th-century conflicts
960
960s conflicts
History of Syrmia
Medieval history of Vojvodina
Principality of Serbia (early medieval)